Song of the Sierras is a 1946 American Western film directed by Oliver Drake and written by Elmer Clifton. The film stars Jimmy Wakely, Lee "Lasses" White, Jack Baxley, Jean Carlin, Iris Lancaster and Zon Murray. The film was released on December 28, 1946, by Monogram Pictures.

Plot

Cast          
Jimmy Wakely as Jimmy Wakely
Lee "Lasses" White as Lasses White
Jack Baxley as Ed Rawlins
Jean Carlin as Mary Ann Blake
Iris Lancaster as Flora Carter 
Zon Murray as Sam Phelps
Budd Buster as Matt Blake
Bob Duncan as Bill Danvers
Buster Slaven as Horace Aikens
Jonathan Black as Colonel Stockton
Jasper Palmer as Hiram Hobbs
Billy Dix as Billy
Wesley Tuttle as Happy

References

External links
 

1946 films
American Western (genre) films
1946 Western (genre) films
Monogram Pictures films
Films directed by Oliver Drake
American black-and-white films
1940s English-language films
1940s American films